Lacedaemonius was an Athenian general of the Philaid clan. He served Athens, notably in the naval Battle of Sybota against the Corinthians in 433 BC.

Biography 
Lacedaemonius was the son of Cimon, a pro-Sparta general and Athenian political figure, and Isodice who was the daughter of Euryptolemus, a cousin of Pericles. He was a grandson of the famous Miltiades IV. An accounted cited that he had a twin called Oulius. He was also the brother of Miltiades VII, who was the oikist in the Adriatic in 324. 

Lacedaemonius comes from Lacedaemon, another name for the city state of Sparta. His father so admired the Spartans he showed them a sign of goodwill by naming his son after their city. Lacedaemonius was also identified as the proxenos of the Spartans at Athens.

Accounts cited Lacedaemonius as one of the Athenian generals sent to aid Corcyra in its conflict with Corinth after an alliance agreement concluded in 433. This is part of the series of events that led to the Peloponnesian War. According to Plutarch, Lacedaemonius sailed with ten ships and was sent forth against his will. Lacedaemonius, who according to Thucydides was sent with three other generals: Diotimus, Strombichus, and Proteas, was ordered not to engage with the Corinthians unless they attacked Corcyra. The Athenian fleet joined the Corcyraeans when the Corinthians finally invaded under Xenocleides. 

A view, which had been advanced by Plutarch, held that giving Lacedaemonius command with a meager fleet for his campaign was an insult to the sons of Cimon due their sympathy for Sparta. Modern historians see Lacedaemonius appointment as a political move on the part of Pericles, who wanted to destroy political opposition by cementing his ties with the Cimonians.  There are also those who propose that Lacedaemonius appointment, his mission, and the size of his fleet was part of a strategy of "minimal deterrence" against Corinth.

Notes and references
Notes

References

Ancient Athenian generals
5th-century BC Athenians
Philaidae
Athenians of the Peloponnesian War